Harald Weinberg (born 13 February 1957) is a German politician. Born in Bad Godesberg, North Rhine-Westphalia, he represents The Left. Harald Weinberg has served as a member of the Bundestag from the state of Bavaria since 2009.

Life 
Since 1986 he worked in market and opinion research at the Gesellschaft für Konsumforschung. From 2003 he was employed by an educational institution of the trade union ver.di. He became member of the bundestag after the 2009 German federal election. He is a member of the Health Committee.

References

External links 

  
 Bundestag biography 

1957 births
Living people
Members of the Bundestag for Bavaria
Members of the Bundestag 2017–2021
Members of the Bundestag 2013–2017
Members of the Bundestag 2009–2013
Members of the Bundestag for The Left
Politicians from Bonn